The National Space Centre in Moscow (Russian: Национальный космический центр) is a large office and manufacturing complex currently under construction adjacent to the Khrunichev factory.

The Russian National Space Centre is a joint initiative between the Heads of Roscosmos, and the Mayor of Moscow, to unite the various entities of the Space industry under one roof. It is scheduled to be completed in 2024, and will include Roscosmos offices, The Russian Mission Control, and the offices of additional 18 space companies.

Characteristics 
The National Space Center is designed to bring together, under one roof, 18 of 30 Moscow's design bureaus and plants of the space industry: a total of about 12,000 new employees (thus, together with 8,000 employees of the Khrunichev Center, which will house 20,000 employees). The center will be part of the special economic zone known as the Technopolis "Moscow" which combines industrial and technological parks in the capital of Russia. Apart from the Roscosmos corporation which will place its main offices in the complex, space companies like ORKK, TsENKI, Glavkosmos and other space corporations will also be transferred here.

Roscosmos offices will be located in a glass tower, with a total area of 250,000 square meters, which will be 200 meters in height, in a triangular rights tower with horizontal structures attached to it.

Purpose 
The concentration of factories and industries in the aerospace industry is intended to create a synergistic effect from the increase in their interaction and collaboration, to create a qualitatively new environment and to reduce the economic costs of the split enterprises.

History 
The idea of creating the National Space Center was proposed in 2018 by Roscosmos Director Dmitry Rogozin; Russian President Vladimir Putin announced this plan in February 2019, while the idea of putting the center on the territory of the Khrunichev Center was suggested by the Mayor of Moscow, Sergei Sobyanin.

The construction of the National Space Center is carried out by the construction and engineering holding company "Mosinzhproekt". The Construction began in 2019, and is scheduled for completion in 2022; by 2023, the various industrial organizations will move to the new complex.

Gallery

References

External links 
 Putin orders government to create National Space Center in Moscow

Roscosmos
Aerospace museums in Russia
Science museums in Russia
2019 establishments in Russia
Buildings and structures in Moscow
Space program of Russia
Coordinates not on Wikidata